Beloiannisz is a village in Fejér county, Hungary. It was founded by Communist Greek refugees who left Greece after the civil war, and was named after Nikos Beloyannis (Beloiannisz is the Hungarian spelling of his name).

Location
Beloiannisz is close to the railway station of Iváncsa, which is on the Budapest–Pusztaszabolcs railway line. Most of the buses connecting Besnyő and Dunaújváros stop at the village, but the railway plays a more important role.

History
The village is among the newest in the county; its construction was started on May 6, 1950. The village was built by volunteers; within a short time, 418 houses, a school, a kindergarten, a library, a community hall, a doctor's office and a town hall were built. On April 3, 1952 the village (previously called Görögfalva, "Greeks' Village") took the name of Nikos Beloyannis, the Communist leader and resistance fighter, who had been executed 4 days earlier in Greece. The village had 1850 inhabitants then.

Starting in 1974, several Greeks left the village and went back to Greece, but many of them (especially the younger people) stayed in Hungary. Now the majority of the population works in the nearby cities of Budapest, Százhalombatta and Dunaújváros. Many people still maintain their Greek identity. According to the 2001 census it had 1,185 inhabitants, 23.4% of them considered themselves Greek, 61.4% Hungarian, 0,3% Romanian, 14,9% didn't answer. Religions: 25.5% Roman Catholic, 14.3% Greek Orthodox, 5.7% Calvinist.

A Greek Orthodox church was built in 1996.

Tourist sights
 Greek Orthodox church (1996)
 Village library; main square

References

External links 

 Community of Beloiannisz Homepage
 A post-communist Greek village in Hungary
 Community of Beloiannisz Homepage

Populated places in Fejér County
Hungarian people of Greek descent
Greek diaspora in Europe